Proterosceliopsis is an extinct genus of platygastroid parasitic wasp, known from the Mid-Cretaceous of Eurasia. The genus was first described in 2014 from the Albian amber of the Escucha Formation. In 2019 additional species were described from the Cenomanian-age Burmese amber, and was placed into the monotypic family Proterosceliopsidae.

Taxonomy 
In the initial 2014 description, the genus was placed in the Scelionidae. However, traditional Scelionidae was found to be polyphyletic in a 2007 study, which recovered a "main scelionid clade" as monophyletic. In the 2019 study describing the Burmese amber species, it was found to exhibit a unique combination of characters placing it outside both the modified Scelionidae and Platygastridae, thus causing it to be placed in a new family within Platygastroidea.

Species 

 Proterosceliopsis ambulata Talamas et al. 2019 Burmese amber
 Proterosceliopsis masneri Ortega-Blanco et al. 2014 Spanish amber
 Proterosceliopsis nigon Talamas et al. 2019 Burmese amber 
 Proterosceliopsis plurima Talamas et al. 2019 Burmese amber
 Proterosceliopsis torquata Talamas et al. 2019 Burmese amber
 Proterosceliopsis wingerathi Talamas et al. 2019 Burmese amber

References 

Burmese amber
Prehistoric hymenoptera